Tappita District was one of six districts located in Nimba County, Liberia. The Jackson F. Doe Memorial Regional Referral Hospital opened in 2011.

References

Districts of Liberia
Nimba County